The Elias Fund is a nonprofit organization funding community development and education for Zimbabwean youth.

Overview
The Elias Fund began with a simple purpose - help one man raise his children. Today EF empowers Zimbabwean communities to build a promising future for their children through poverty alleviation. As a grassroots organization, the Elias Fund focuses on indigenous empowerment to alleviate poverty from the bottom-up.

Mission statement
The Elias Fund's mission statement is: "Spreading hope and opportunity in Zimbabwe through indigenous empowerment, and engaging the current youth culture of the United States by encouraging a positive identity centered on social justice."

History
In 1994, Elias Sithole, a gardener in Zimbabwe, met American songwriter Chad Urmston. Elias shared his dream of one day helping his three sons with a university education. This dream was put to song and became a popular piece with Urmston's band Dispatch. After the band broke up in 2004, brothers Eric and Scott Byington were approached to fundraise for a small initiative to sponsor Elias’ sons’ education.

A successful fundraiser was hosted in the summer of 2005 with enough money being raised for all three of Elias’ sons. Eric and Scott, along with a team of four others, took off to Zimbabwe to go find Elias. While they were gone, over 1,200 young people signed-up to do something more for Zimbabwe even though nothing more had been planned or publicized. It became apparent to Eric and Scott that what had started as a single fundraiser for one man's family could be turned into a full-time organization for Zimbabwe's development.

And so with the fan-base of Dispatch in support, Eric and Scott turned their relationship with Elias into the organization the Elias Fund is today. EF is now operating in three specific communities providing support to indigenous organizations focused on education, food aid and micro-grants. From one man's dream has sprung a movement spreading hope and opportunity in Zimbabwe.

References

External links
Official website
Elias Fund on Facebook
Elias Fund at MySpace

Charities based in Massachusetts
Foreign charities operating in Zimbabwe
Education in Zimbabwe
Development charities based in the United States
Organizations established in 2005
2005 establishments in Massachusetts